Temülün (–?) was the youngest full sibling and only sister of Genghis Khan (born Temüjin), the famed founder and Great Khan of the Mongol Empire. Her parents were Yesügei, chief of the Borjigin clan in the Khamag Mongol confederation, and his second wife Höelün. She was nine years younger than Temüjin.

Biography

Early life 
Temülün's name, like her brother's, comes from the stem temü or temür, meaning "iron." The suffix -lun is a common feminine name ending.

The Secret History of the Mongols, a chronicle of Mongol history, mentions Temülün three times: in an account of Temüjin's legendary birth and twice in an episode wherein an infant Temülün and her family are attacked by the Taychiud tribe.

Temülün's father Yesügei died in a Tatar attack when she was a baby, leaving the rest of the family to be raised by Höelun.

She had six older brothers: Temüjin, Qasar, Hachiun, Temüge, Behter, and Belgütei (the latter two having been her half siblings).

References 

Genghis Khan
Women of the Mongol Empire